Assignment, assign or The Assignment may refer to:

 Homework
 Sex assignment
 The process of sending National Basketball Association players to its development league; see

Computing
 Assignment (computer science), a type of modification to a variable
 Drive letter assignment, the process of assigning alphabetical identifiers to disk drives or partitions
 ASSIGN (DOS command)

Mathematics
 Assignment problem, a type of math problem
 Assignment (mathematical logic)

Financial and legal
 Assignment (housing law), a concept that allows the transfer of a tenancy from one person to another
 Assignment (law), a transfer of rights between two parties
 Along with clearing, a stage in exercising a financial option
 General assignment or Assignment for the Benefit of Creditors, an alternative to bankruptcy for businesses that's available in British common law and some US states

Entertainment

Literature
 The Assignment (novella), by Friedrich Dürrenmatt
 The Assignment, a 2016 book by Sophie Labelle
 The Assignment, a 2020 novel by Liza Wiemer

Film and TV
 The Assignment (1977 film)
 The Assignment (1997 film)
 Assignment (2015 film)
 The Assignment (2016 film)
 "The Assignment" (Star Trek: Deep Space Nine)
 Assignment (TV program), a late night news magazine program

See also